

Karl von Oberkamp (30 October 1893 – 4 May 1947) was a German Waffen-SS commander and war criminal during World War II. During his SS career, he commanded the SS Division Prinz Eugen, the SS Division Nibelungen and the V SS Mountain Corps. 

Following World War II, Oberkamp was extradited to Yugoslavia, where he was tried for war crimes. He was sentenced to death and hanged in Belgrade on 4 May 1947.

See also
List SS-Brigadeführer

References
 

1893 births
1947 deaths
SS-Brigadeführer
Recipients of the clasp to the Iron Cross, 1st class
Nazis executed by Yugoslavia by hanging
Executed people from Bavaria
Nazis convicted of war crimes
People extradited from Germany
People extradited to Yugoslavia
Military personnel from Munich
People from the Kingdom of Bavaria
Prussian Army personnel
German Army personnel of World War I
Waffen-SS personnel
Executed military leaders